The 2008 congressional elections in Connecticut were held on November 4, 2008, to determine who will represent the state of Connecticut in the United States House of Representatives, coinciding with the presidential election. Representatives are elected for two-year terms; those elected will serve in the 111th Congress from January 3, 2009, until January 3, 2011.

Connecticut has five seats in the House, apportioned according to the 2000 United States Census. Its 2007-2008 congressional delegation consisted of four Democrats and one Republican. In the 2008 elections, District 4 changed from Republican to Democratic, so Connecticut's congressional delegation to the 111th Congress consists of five Democrats, giving Connecticut an all democratic congressional delegation for the 1st time since 1967. Christopher Shays, the Republican incumbent in District 4, had been the last remaining Republican representative in New England. Prior to the election, CQ Politics forecasted districts 2, 4 and 5 to be at some risk for the incumbent party.

The Primary election was held August 12th.

Overview 

 The Working Families Party endorsed all the Democratic candidates on a fusion ticket. In the previous election it only endorsed one Democratic candidate.

Match-up summary

District 1

This district covers much of central Connecticut and includes municipalities within Hartford, Litchfield, and Middlesex counties. Five-term incumbent John B. Larson faced Republican Joe Visconti and Green Party candidate Stephen E. D. Fournier. CQ Politics forecasted the race as 'Safe Democrat'.
Larson's campaign website
Visconti's campaign website
Fournier's campaign website
Race ranking and details from CQ Politics
Campaign contributions from OpenSecrets

Results
Incumbent John B. Larson retained his seat with over 71 percent of the vote.

Includes 17,000 votes from the Working Families Party line, which endorsed Larson on a fusion ticket.

District 2

This district covers eastern Connecticut, including New London and Norwich. CQ Politics forecasted the race as 'Democrat Favored'.

In the closest U.S. House race of 2006, Democrat Joe Courtney unseated three-term incumbent Republican Rob Simmons by only 82 votes. Courtney's chance at reelection increased when Simmons decided against a rematch. Former Naval Submarine Base New London base commander Sean Sullivan was the Republican candidate. Third-party challengers included former State Department Of Environmental Protection scientist G. Scott Deshefy for the Green Party and Todd Vachon for the Socialist Party, running as a write-in candidate.

Courtney's campaign website
Sullivan's campaign website
Deshefy's campaign website
Vachon's campaign website
Race ranking and details from CQ Politics
Campaign contributions from OpenSecrets

Results
Joe Courtney was reelected with a substantially larger margin than in 2006, winning nearly 66 percent of the vote.

Includes 13,164 votes from the Working Families Party line, which endorsed Courtney on a fusion ticket.

District 3

This district is centered on the city of New Haven and its immediate suburbs. CQ Politics forecasted the race as 'Safe Democrat'.

The district has been represented by Democrat Rosa DeLauro since 1991. Her challengers in this election included Republican Bo Itshaky and Green Ralph Ferrucci.

DeLauro's campaign website
Itshaky's campaign website
Race ranking and details from CQ Politics
Campaign contributions from OpenSecrets

Results
Rosa DeLauro was easily reelected to a tenth term, receiving over 77 percent of the vote.

Includes 25,411 votes from the Working Families Party line, which endorsed DeLauro on a fusion ticket.

District 4

This district includes portions of Fairfield and New Haven counties in southwestern Connecticut. Democratic nominee Jim Himes, a former Goldman Sachs executive, won against Republican incumbent Chris Shays and third-party candidates Richard Duffee, who withdrew from the 2006 race, and Michael Anthony Carrano. CQ Politics forecasted the race as 'No Clear Favorite'.

Shays won 51% of the vote in 2006 and 52% in 2004 in a district that went to John Kerry with 53% in 2004 (CPVI=D+5). In September, 2007, Shays indicated that if he was not given the top Republican seat on the Governmental Oversight Committee, he would retire. The only Republican House member in New England, he was expected to be a top target of Democrats.

Democrat Himes announced his candidacy in April 2007. 2006 U.S. Senate candidate Ned Lamont was considered a potential candidate, although he lost in this district to incumbent Senator Joe Lieberman, whom Shays had endorsed. Other possible Democratic candidates included state Senators Bob Duff and Andrew MacDonald. Former professional hockey player Mike Richter, once considered a possible candidate, announced that he was not interested in running in 2008. It was thought Lowell P. Weicker, Jr. might try to reclaim his old seat. 
Shay's campaign website
Himes' campaign website
Duffee's campaign website
Race ranking and details from CQ Politics
Campaign contributions from OpenSecrets

Results
Jim Himes defeated incumbent Christopher Shays, receiving slightly more than 51 percent of the vote. With Himes' victory, the Democrats now control all five of Connecticut's House seats, as well as all other House seats in New England.

Includes 9,130 votes from the Working Families Party line, which endorsed Himes on a fusion ticket.

District 5

This district includes all of Northwestern Connecticut, and runs from Meriden and New Britain in Central Connecticut, to Waterbury, the Litchfield Hills, and the Farmington River Valley. CQ Politics forecasted the race as 'Leans Democratic'.

Freshman Democrat Chris Murphy unseated 24-year incumbent Nancy Johnson with 56% of the vote in 2006. Nonetheless, the district is arguably Connecticut's most conservative (CPVI=D+4), and some considered Murphy vulnerable. State Senator David Cappiello was the Republican candidate. Tony Nania also considered a run, but withdrew from consideration for the Republican nomination in May. GOP state chairman Chris Healy dismissed claims that Murphy's large campaign warchest of $420,000 in the first quarter of 2007 may scare off potential challengers, as Cappiello filed as a candidate in April 2007.  

National Republicans ran radio ads in the summer of 2007 claiming Murphy has adopted special interest fundraising politics he had claimed to oppose. In addition, Cappiello accused Murphy of missing important votes. 

Third-party candidates included Canton attorney Harold Burbank for the Green Party and Watertown resident Tom Winn, running as an independent candidate.

Murphy's campaign website
Cappiello's campaign website 
Burbank's campaign website
Winn's campaign website
Race ranking and details from CQ Politics
Campaign contributions from OpenSecrets

Results
Chris Murphy retained his seat, receiving just under 60 percent of the vote.

Includes 18,149 votes from the Working Families Party line, which endorsed Murphy on a fusion ticket.

References

External links
Elections and Voting from the Connecticut Secretary of State 
U.S. Congress candidates for Connecticut at Project Vote Smart
Connecticut U.S. House Races from 2008 Race Tracker
Campaign contributions for Connecticut congressional races from OpenSecrets

2008
Connecticut
United States House of Representatives